Limited Live & Rare is a rare promotional live EP from band Ammonia. The tracks are taken from various Triple J recordings.

Track listing
"Mint 400 (live)" – 2:26
"You're Not the Only One Who Feels This Way (live)" – 3:43
"Drugs (live)" – 3:29
"Wishing Chair (live)" – 3:03
"In a Box (live)" – 2:50
"4711 (live)" – 3:39

1998 EPs
1998 live albums
Ammonia (band) albums
Murmur (record label) EPs
Live EPs